The twentieth European Masters Athletics Championships was held in Aarhus, Denmark, from 27 July-6 August 2017. The European Masters Athletics Championships serve the division of the sport of athletics for people over 35 years of age, referred to as masters athletics.

References 

European Masters Athletics Championships
European Masters Athletics Championships
European Masters Athletics Championships
International athletics competitions hosted by Denmark
Sport in Aarhus
European Masters Athletics Championships
European Masters Athletics Championships